Nawat Phumphotingam (also known as White, born 2 June 1995) is a Thai actor. He is known for his main role as Phun in MCOT's Love Sick: The Series (2014–2015).

Early life and education 
Nawat was born in Bangkok, Thailand and is an only child. He completed his secondary education at Assumption College and graduated with a bachelor's degree in business administration, major in marketing at Bangkok University.

Acting

2014 & 2015 
Nawat auditioned for Love Sick: The Series in an open call audition. He was called back to take on the role of Phun. He was initially worried about taking on the role of Phun because he didn't want to cut his hair, as the directors initially wanted for his character and he wasn't interested in portraying a gay character as he was concerned on how people would perceive him for taking on the role. He later decided to join the cast and was happy because of the warm reception he received from fans of the show. The series ran for two seasons from 2014 to 2015, and garnered awards together with his lead co-star Chonlathorn Kongyingyong.

2016 
He took on the role of Pe, in the Senior Secret Love: My Lil Boy about a girl trying to charm a boy named S. He appeared in the two parts of the series. In the same year, Nawat joined the cast of War of High School: The Series, taking on the role of Rickey.

2017 
In 2017, Nawat was cast in the role of Kirun, in U-Prince Series. He was joined by his Love Sick: The Series co-star, Chonlathorn, who played his brother, Kiryu, in the series. He appeared in four of the twelve parts of the said series namely Playful Comm Arts, Extroverted Humanist,  Single Lawyer and Ambitious Boss. In the same year, he appeared in Water Boyy: The Series, playing in the role of Fah.

2018 
He played Bo in the Thai romance drama, Mint to Be. In the same year, he also joined the cast of the comedy romance Beauty Boy: The Series.

2019 
He reprised his role as Phun from Love Sick: The Series in the 3-part omnibus titled ReminderS. It was directed by New Siwaj Sawatmaneekul. The final episode was aired at the Millennial's Choice 2019 fan meeting. He then took on a supporting role in Theory of Love, playing the role of Two.

Personal life 
On 7 July 2019, he was ordained at the Wat Pariwat Ratchasongkhram.

Filmography 
 Love Sick: The Series Season 1 (Phun) (2014)
 Wifi Society: Gray Secret (2015)
 Love Sick: The Series Season 2 (Phun) (2015)
 Senior Secret Love: My Lil Boy (2016)
 War of High School: The Series (2016)
 Senior Secret Love: My Lil Boy 2 (2016)
 U-Prince Series: Playful Comm Arts (2017)
 U-Prince the Series: Extroverted Humanist ( 2017)
 U-Prince the Series: Single Lawyer (2017)
 U-Prince the Series: Ambitious Boss (2017)
 Water Boyy: The Series (2017)
 School Rangers (2018)
 Mint To Be (2018)
 Beauty Boy: The Series (2018)
 ReminderS (2019)
 Theory of Love (2019)
 A Tale of Thousand Stars (2021)

References

External links 
 

1995 births
Living people
Nawat Phumphotingam
Nawat Phumphotingam
Nawat Phumphotingam
Nawat Phumphotingam
Nawat Phumphotingam